The Paris Parisians were a Minor League Baseball team that played in the Class D Kentucky–Illinois–Tennessee League (KITTY League) from 1922 to 1924. They were located in Paris, Tennessee, and played their home games at Barton Field. The team was known as the Paris Travelers in the 1922 season, but they played as the Parisians from 1923 to 1924.

History
The team began competition in 1922 as the Paris Travelers playing at Barton Field. They opened their inaugural season on May 16 with a 10–0 home win against the Fulton Railroaders. Managed by Tuffy Fowlkes, the Travelers won the second half of the split season after several games involving the Cairo Egyptians, Hopkinsville Hoppers, and Madisonville Miners were thrown out. In the best-of-seven series for the KITTY League championship, Paris was defeated by the first half champion Mayfield Pantmakers, 4–2. Their season record was 58–52 (.527).

They were renamed the Paris Parisians in 1923. On July 19, Jim Turner pitched a 10–0 no-hitter against the Milan-Trenton Twins at Barton Field. They compiled a season record of 46–55 (.455) but failed to win either half of the season. Their record for the season was 46–55 (.455).

Under manager Earl Quellmalz, the Parisians won the second half of the 1924 campaign on the last day of the season. On the next-to-last day, the league president threw out three wins belonging to the Jackson Blue Jays because they exceeded the limit of Class C players on their roster. This moved Paris into a tie for first with Jackson. The two teams were scheduled to meet on September 6 to close the season and decide the second half title.  Paris won, 8–4, to advance to the KITTY League championship series. The Parisians were swept by the Dyersburg Forked Deers, 4–0, in the best-of-seven series. Paris' final game was a 4–1 loss at Dyersburg on September 16. In total, they went 59–50 (.541) on the year. Over all three seasons of competition, Paris' all-time regular season record was 163–157 (.509).

Season-by-season results

Notable players

Six Paris players also played in at least one game in Major League Baseball during their careers. These players and their seasons with Paris were:

Ben Cantwell (1923)
Tom Jenkins (1923)
Jimmy Moore (1923)
Harry Rice (1922)
Jim Turner (1923–1924)
Herb Welch (1922–1923)

References

External links
Statistics from Baseball-Reference
Statistics from Stats Crew

1922 establishments in Tennessee
1924 disestablishments in Tennessee
Baseball teams established in 1922
Baseball teams disestablished in 1924
Defunct baseball teams in Tennessee
Defunct minor league baseball teams
Kentucky-Illinois-Tennessee League teams
Professional baseball teams in Tennessee